Bet Cha Say That to All The Girls is the seventh studio album by American R&B and pop girl group Sister Sledge. It was released in 1983 on the Cotillion Records label. Singles from the album included "B.Y.O.B (Bring Your Own Baby)", "Gotta Get Back to Love", "Thank You for the Party". The album peaked at number 169 on the Billboard 200 chart and number 35 on the Top R&B Albums chart in 1983.

Track listing

Charts

Personnel 

Personnel adapted from liner notes.
Sister Sledge
 Kathy Sledge Lightfoot – Lead vocals (Tracks 1, 2, 4, 6, 7, 8, 9, 10)
 Joni Sledge – Lead vocals (Tracks 2, 8)
 Debbie Sledge Young – Lead vocals (Tracks 2, 3)
 Kim Sledge – Lead vocals (Tracks 2, 5)
with:
 Al Jarreau – rap (track 8)
 Jeffrey Osborne – backing vocals (track 10)
 George Duke – keyboards, Linn drum machine
 Charles Fearing – guitar (track 2)
 Peter Rafelson – guitar (track 4)
 Mike Sembello – guitar
 Louis Johnson – bass
 Freddie Washington – bass (tracks 1, 6)
 Nathan Watts – bass (track 2)
 David Paul Bryant – Moog bass (track 4)
 Ricky Lawson – drums
 Paulinho Da Costa – percussion
 Larry Williams – flute, tenor & baritone saxophone
 Ronnie Lewis – soprano saxophone (track 3)
 Gary Grant, Jerry Hey – trumpet & flugelhorn
 Lou McGreary – trombone, bass trombone
 Dorothy Remsen – harp
 Assa Dori, Brenton B. Banks, George Kast, Gerald Vinci, Irma Neumann, Joy Lyle, Marylin R. Graham, Reg Hill, Robert Shushel, Sherril C. Baptist, Stuart V. Canin, Thomas R. Buffum – violin
 Allan Harshman, David Schwartz, Rollice E. Dale, Samuel Boghosian – viola
 Barbara Hunter, Earl S. Madison, Frederick Seykora, Raymond S. Kelley – cello

Production

 Producer: George Duke 
 Assistant producer: Cheryl R. Brown
 Vocal arrangements by George Duke & Sister Sledge
 Horn arrangements by George Duke (tracks: A5, B3) & Jerry Hey (tracks: A1 to A4, B1, B2, B4, B5)
 Strings conductor & string arrangements: George Del Barrio
 Strings contractor: Bill Hughes
 Recording & remix engineer: Tommy Vicari
 Additional engineering: Erik Zobler

References

External links 
 Sister Sledge - Bet Cha Say That to All the Girls (1983) album to be listened as stream on Spotify

1983 albums
Cotillion Records albums
Sister Sledge albums
Albums produced by George Duke